The Edge Hill Light Railway, one of Colonel Stephens' light railways, was in Warwickshire, England. It was designed to carry ironstone from  Edge Hill Quarries to Burton Dassett where a junction was made with the Stratford-upon-Avon and Midland Junction Railway. It was never officially opened, but began operating in 1922.

In the middle of the line, there was a cable-worked inclined plane at 1 in 6 (16%). As the quarry was at the top of the incline, the incline could be worked as self-acting: the weight of full ore wagons descending was sufficient to draw the empties back up.

Within three years it was found that the iron ore deposits were uneconomic, and the line ceased operating in 1925. It was not dismantled until 1946. A caretaker was employed until the late 1930s in the possibility that the line could be re-opened. In 1942, permanent way from the lower portion of the line was requisitioned for the construction of the army depot now known as MoD Kineton. This had the effect of isolating the line, and the remaining stock at the top of the incline, from the main line and so they survived there until 1946.

Locomotives

Goods stock

References

Further reading

External links

 Edge Hill Light Railway, via The Colonel Stephens Railway Museum
 Photos of the railway, via Yahoo
 The line in relation to the SMJ, via SMJ Society
 The line in 1945, via Michael Clemens Railways
https://web.archive.org/web/20100324132738/http://www.colonelstephenssociety.co.uk/EHLR%20photo%20gallery.html
http://warwickshirerailways.com/misc/ehlr.htm

Rail transport in Warwickshire
History of Warwickshire
Railway lines opened in 1922
Railway lines closed in 1925
HF Stephens